delete.delete.i.eat.meat is a debut Studio album by Ghostland Observatory released in 2006 under Trashy Moped Recordings.

Track listing

References

2005 albums
Ghostland Observatory albums